Herzog (female Herzogin) is a German hereditary title held by one who rules a territorial duchy, exercises feudal authority over an estate called a duchy, or possesses a right by law or tradition to be referred to by the ducal title. The word is usually translated by the English duke and the Latin dux. Generally, a Herzog ranks below a king and above a count. Whether the title is deemed higher or lower than titles translated into English as "prince" (Fürst) has depended upon the language, country and era in which the titles coexisted.

History
Herzog is not related to Herz ('heart'), but is derived from German(ic) He(e)r (English: 'army') and zog (ziehen) (English: 'to move' or 'to pull', also: in die Schlacht ziehen – "to go into battle", related to the modern English verb to tug), a military leader (compare to Slavic voivode). It may have originated from the Proto-Germanic title of Harjatugô, who were elected by their tribes to lead them into battle. Thus, Herzog was a title borne by Germanic warriors who exercised military authority over a tribe by general acclaim among its members or warriors, especially in the stem duchies.

During the medieval era, some of the most powerful vassals whose territories lay within the boundaries of the Holy Roman Empire took or were granted the title of Herzog by the Emperor. Several dynasties, such as the Habsburgs of Austria, Hohenzollerns of Prussia, Welfs of Hanover, Wettins of Saxony, Wittelsbachs of Bavaria and the House of Württemberg, held the Herzogswürde (dukedom) before becoming kings.

Although a Herzog ranked below a Prince Elector within the Empire, he also belonged by hereditary right to the Fürstenbank (Chamber of Princes) within the Reichstag, exercised Landeshoheit within his Imperial state and enjoyed Reichsunmittelbarkeit within the Empire. Therefore, Herzöge were regarded as members of the Hoher Adel (reigning nobility) whose families inter-married with sovereign dynasties outside as well as within the Empire. They ranked as royalty, distinct from nobles who were subject to a lesser suzerain than the Emperor.

Occasionally, the Emperor conferred the title of Herzog on a nobleman who was not necessarily a Prince of the Holy Roman Empire and did not rule a duchy. Such a person ranked only as a Titularherzog (duke-by-title) in Germany's non-reigning nobility.

Current usage
Herzog was borrowed into other European languages, with the chief meaning of the word being "duke", such as Russian gertsog (герцог), Belarusian hertsag, Croatian, Serbian and Bosnian herceg (херцег; e.g., Herzegovina), Bulgarian hertsog, Latvian hercogs, Lithuanian hercogas, Estonian hertsog, Finnish herttua, Hungarian herceg, Georgian herts’ogi, Danish hertug, Dutch and Afrikaans hertog, Icelandic hertogi, Luxemburgish Herzog, Norwegian hertug and Swedish hertig.

The Slavic semantic equivalent of Herzog (for example in Polish) is voivode, or Russian воевода, where voi- (army) and -vode (to lead, to guide). Some historical territories of the former Yugoslavia have both names of Herzegovina and Vojvodina.

Herzog is not uncommon as a surname in German-speaking countries. The surname does not indicate an aristocratic origin (much like the family name "King" in English does not indicate a royal ancestry).

See also

 Dukes in Italy, Germany and Austria
 Voivode
 König

References

German noble titles

de:Herzog
he:הרצוג (תואר)